Nikanor I, also referred to as Nikanor; Nikanor I, Serbian Patriarch; and Nicanor was a Serbian Orthodox prelate.

Career 
He became the 17th Archbishop of Peć and Serbian Patriarch when he replaced Savatije Sokolović in 1588. Church records state that  he was enthroned in 1588 but lack information about his term. Jerotej Sokolović succeeded him the following year. 

He came from Novo Brdo and was instrumental in establishing the first printing press in Serbia.

While at the Gračanica Monastery, he was credited for producing manuscripts in the Serbian version of the Old Church Slavonic. As a Metropolitan, he was a donor of cathedra icons.

See also
 List of heads of the Serbian Orthodox Church

References 

16th-century Serbian people
16th-century Eastern Orthodox archbishops
16th-century births
Patriarchs of the Serbian Orthodox Church
Ottoman Serbia
Serbs from the Ottoman Empire
16th-century people from the Ottoman Empire